Xin Hun Gong Yu (translated as Newlywed Apartment) was a 2016 Chinese sitcom television series that aired on Dragon TV from January 11 to May 23, 2016. The series is an adaptation of the American sitcom Mad About You. The series stars husband-and-wife actors Li Jiahang and Li Sheng.

The series ran for 60 episodes.

Plot
After Xie Xiaojun and Wu Yue got married five months ago, they were trying to find the ultimate answer to marriage. Soon, they realized that marriage was not what they expected, and they had to deal with their boss, neighbors, and unreliable friends.

Cast
Li Jiahang as Xie Xiaojun (谢晓骏)
 as Wu Yue (吴越)
Zhang Yufei as Shasha
Guan Le as Su Cai
Guo Jiahao as Ouyang Chendi
Tian Lei as Ma Ding

Production
The series is produced by Sony Pictures Television, Huaso Film/TV Digital Production and Croton Media. Billy Grundfest, who wrote and produced for the original series, was a consultant on the adaptation. Although it is not the first Chinese multi-camera series, Xin Hun Gong Yu is the first Chinese television series to utilize a writer's room and production style commonly used by American television producers.

References

Chinese television sitcoms
Chinese television series based on American television series
Television series by Sony Pictures Television
2016 Chinese television series debuts
2016 Chinese television series endings
Dragon Television original programming
Television series by Croton Media